Mieszkowski is a Polish surname. Notable people with the surname include:

Ed Mieszkowski (1925–2004), American football player
Katharine Mieszkowski (born 1971), American journalist
Piotr Mieszkowski (died 1648), Polish bishop and writer

Polish-language surnames